The 1993 season was the Hawthorn Football Club's 69th season in the Australian Football League and 92nd overall.

Fixture

Premiership season

Finals series

Ladder

References

Hawthorn Football Club seasons